Zyxomma petiolatum, known by the common names long-tailed duskdarter, brown dusk hawk and dingy duskflyer, is a species of dragonfly in the family Libellulidae. It is widespread in many Asian countries, New Guinea, northern Australia and islands in the Pacific.

Description and habitat
It is a medium-sized chocolate-brown colored dragonfly with emerald-green eyes. Female is similar to the males. It breeds in small pools, ponds, swamps and slow flowing rivers. It is crepuscular but may also be active during overcast days. Usually seen in the evening as an extremely rapid flyer, flying low over water-bodies, hawking midges and mosquitoes. In daytime it roosts among vegetation and can be difficult to find.

See also
 List of odonates of Sri Lanka
 List of odonates of India
 List of odonata of Kerala
 List of Odonata species of Australia

References

 World Dragonflies
 Animal diversity web
 Query Results
 Sri Lanka Biodiversity

External links

Libellulidae
Odonata of Asia
Odonata of Australia
Insects of India
Insects of New Guinea
Taxa named by Jules Pierre Rambur
Insects described in 1842